Gnassingbé is an African name which may refer to:

Faure Gnassingbé, President of Togo (2005–present)
Kpatcha Gnassingbé, Togolese politician
Gnassingbé Eyadéma, President of Togo (1967–2005)

See also
Gnassingbé Eyadéma International Airport